Cosmopterosis spatha is a moth in the family Crambidae. It was described by Maria Alma Solis in 2009. It is found in Costa Rica, where it has been recorded from the provinces of Alajuela, Guanacaste, Limon and Puntarenas. It is found at altitudes between 50 and 1,600 meters.

The costa and apical one third of the forewings is golden yellow, while the basal one fourth is ocherous to very pale brown. The basal, subbasal and antemedial lines consist of brown-tipped scales. The hindwings have subbasal and medial lines consisting of brown-tipped scales. The area between these lines is rufous. The postmedial and subterminal lines consist of brown-tipped scales.

The larvae feed on Capparis mollicella and Forchhammeria trifoliata.

Etymology
The species name refers to the broadly spatulate, posteroventral flange on the sacculus of the male and is derived from Latin spatha (meaning broad blade).

References

Glaphyriinae
Moths described in 2009